Camelina oil or False flax oil is a pressed seed oil, derived from the Camelina sativa or false flax, also called gold of pleasure. False flax has long been grown in Europe, and its oil used as a lamp oil until the 18th century. In recent times, it has been explored for use in cosmetic and skin care products. It has a high content of omega-3 and is used as a food supplement by some cultures. It is registered under the name "Olej rydzowy tradycyjny" as a Traditional Speciality Guaranteed product in the European Union and the United Kingdom.

In the United States the Food and Drug Administration has not rated the oil for human consumption. False flax belongs to the Brassicaceae (mustard and cabbage) family, which also contains many other seed oil plants, such as rapeseed. Typically it contains 1–3% erucic acid but several Camelina Sativa varieties with erucic acid content of less than 1% have been introduced.

The seeds contain an average of 37% by weight of oil, and contains the following fatty acids:

References

See also 

 Biodiesel
 Vegetable oils
 Rapeseed oil

Vegetable oils